Martha Tenorio Pancar (born August 6, 1966) is an Ecuadorian retired female long-distance runner. She competed for her native country at three consecutive Summer Olympics, starting in 1992. Tenorio carried the flag for Ecuador at the opening ceremony of the 2000 Summer Olympics in Sydney, Australia.

International competitions

External links

1966 births
Living people
People from Salcedo Canton
Ecuadorian female marathon runners
Ecuadorian female long-distance runners
Olympic athletes of Ecuador
Athletes (track and field) at the 1992 Summer Olympics
Athletes (track and field) at the 1996 Summer Olympics
Athletes (track and field) at the 2000 Summer Olympics
Pan American Games competitors for Ecuador
Athletes (track and field) at the 1995 Pan American Games
Athletes (track and field) at the 1999 Pan American Games
Athletes (track and field) at the 2003 Pan American Games
World Athletics Championships athletes for Ecuador
South American Games gold medalists for Ecuador
South American Games medalists in athletics
Competitors at the 1998 South American Games
21st-century Ecuadorian women
20th-century Ecuadorian women